Lawrence Township is a civil township of Van Buren County in the U.S. state of Michigan. The population was 3,341 at the 2000 census. The Village of Lawrence is located within the township.

Geography

Demographics
As of the census of 2000, there were 3,341 people, 1,194 households, and 893 families residing in the township. The racial makeup of the township was 84.47% White, 2.93% African American, 1.08% Native American, 0.36% Asian, 7.09% from other races, and 4.07% from two or more races. Hispanic or Latino of any race were 13.41% of the population.

There were 1,194 households, out of which 35.3% had children under the age of 18 living with them, 58.7% were married couples living together, 11.1% had a female householder with no husband present, and 25.2% were non-families. 20.4% of all households were made up of individuals, and 9.1% had someone living alone who was 65 years of age or older.  The average household size was 2.74 and the average family size was 3.16.

In the township the population was spread out, with 29.0% under the age of 18, 7.7% from 18 to 24, 27.1% from 25 to 44, 24.0% from 45 to 64, and 12.2% who were 65 years of age or older.  The median age was 36 years. For every 100 females, there were 95.8 males.  For every 100 females age 18 and over, there were 94.2 males.

The median income for a household in the township was $36,944, and the median income for a family was $45,781. Males had a median income of $30,964 versus $24,779 for females. The per capita income for the township was $16,246.  About 7.1% of families and 12.8% of the population were below the poverty line, including 15.2% of those under age 18 and 10.4% of those age 65 or over.

References

External links
Lawrence Township Website

Townships in Van Buren County, Michigan
Kalamazoo–Portage metropolitan area
Townships in Michigan